Veijo Mikkolainen (25 August 1924 – 7 April 2013) was a Finnish rower. He competed in the men's coxed pair event at the 1952 Summer Olympics.

References

External links
  

1924 births
2013 deaths
Finnish male rowers
Olympic rowers of Finland
Rowers at the 1952 Summer Olympics